The 2022–23 San Diego State Aztecs men's basketball team represents San Diego State University during the 2022–23 NCAA Division I men's basketball season. The Aztecs, led by sixth-year head coach Brian Dutcher, plays their home games at Viejas Arena as members in the Mountain West Conference.

Previous season
The Aztecs finished the 2021–22 season 23–9, 13–4 in Mountain West play to finish in third place. In the Mountain West tournament, they defeated Fresno State and Colorado State to advance to the championship game, where they lost to Boise State. They received an at-large bid to the NCAA tournament as the No. 8 seed in the Midwest Region, where they lost in the first round to Creighton.

Offseason

Departures

Incoming transfers

2022 recruiting class

Roster

Schedule and results

|-
!colspan=9 style=| Exhibition

|-
!colspan=9 style=| Non-conference regular season

|-
!colspan=9 style=| Mountain West regular season

|-
!colspan=9 style=| Mountain West tournament

|-
!colspan=12 style=""| NCAA tournament

Source

Rankings

*AP does not release post-NCAA Tournament rankings.

References

San Diego State Aztecs men's basketball seasons
San Diego State
San Diego State
San Diego State
San Diego State